Elin Bragnum (born 1 May 1994) is a Swedish football midfielder who played for Piteå IF in the Damallsvenskan. She previously played for AIK and has represented Sweden at the under-17, under-19, and under-23 levels.

References

External links

 
 
 Elin Bragnum at Piteå IF 
  (archive)
 
  (archive)

1994 births
Living people
Swedish women's footballers
Damallsvenskan players
Piteå IF (women) players
AIK Fotboll (women) players
Women's association football midfielders